Wianki (Wreaths, in English) is a cyclical cultural event, taking place annually in Kraków at the bend of Wisła river, near the Wawel hill.

History
In its current form of a mass cultural event, Wianki has existed since 1992, when the patronage of this event was taken over by the Kraków City Hall. However, the tradition of organising cultural events at this spot during the summer solstice reaches back a long time. The festival was primarily a pagan religious event - Noc Kupały. After the adoption of Christianity by Poland, the tradition did not die, however, its context was changed: the night's name became "Sobótka", or "Noc Świętojańska" (St. John's Night). Some elements of the original festival remained, such as telling fortunes, letting wreaths float on water, jumping over bonfires or burning herbs. When Polish territory was annexed by Austria, especially after Kraków was incorporated into the Austro-Hungarian state, Wianki became a patriotic manifestation, when Wanda, the legendary princess from the legend of Prince Krak (the founder of Kraków) was commemorated. Before World War I Wianki was organised by institutions such as Polskie Towarzystwo Gimnastyczne "Sokół" ("Sokół" Polish Gymnastic Society).

After World War II Wreaths became a "light and sound" event - a large-scale open-air performance. The event was partly a dramatic show (which featured theatre plays) and a finale firework show. In the 1970s media patronage was unknown in Poland, but Gazeta Krakowska performed a form of it over the festival.

After martial law was introduced in 1981, Wreaths were not officially organised until 1992. Starting that year, the event is the largest annual cultural event, covering music and other performances, a competition for the most beautiful wreath, firework shows and other attractions

Music performers during the show (starting 2000)
2000 - Brathanki, Maanam
2001 - the event was cancelled due to heavy rainfalls
2002 - Myslovitz, Renata Przemyk
2003 - Kayah
2004 - De Mono, Reni Jusis, show dance "OPENTANIEC"
2005 - Budka Suflera, Krystyna Prońko, Izabela Trojanowska, Patrycja Gola, Felicjan Andrzejczak, Sebastian Riedel
2006 - Polish performers: Krzysztof Kiljański, T.Love, Lech Janerka. International performers: Marillion, Lou Bega
2007 - Polish performers: Daab, Lombard, Mr. Zoob, Róże Europy, Wanda i Banda. International performers: Alphaville, Bananarama, Desireless, Gazebo
2008 - Jamiroquai, Mosqitoo, June, Loco Star
2009 - The Poise Rite, Wilki, Vavamuffin, Patrycja Markowska, Lenny Kravitz
2011 - Wyclef Jean
2013 - Nigel Kennedy
2014 - Polish performers and Fête de la Musique on various scenes (Old Town, main Market Square Rynek, both sides of the Vistula River,  Nowa Huta, etc.)

External links
History of Wreaths in krakow.pl internet service

Festivals in Poland
Culture in Kraków
Tourist attractions in Kraków
Annual events in Poland